The Fortune 1000 are the 1,000 largest American companies ranked by revenues, as compiled by the American business magazine Fortune. It only includes companies which are incorporated or authorized to do business in the United States, and for which revenues are publicly available (regardless of whether they are public companies listed on a stock market). The Fortune 500 is the subset of the list that is its 500 largest companies.

The list draws the attention of business readers seeking to learn the influential players in the American economy and prospective sales targets, as these companies tend to have large budgets and staff needs.

Walmart was number one on the list for five of the seven years from 2007 to 2014, interrupted only by ExxonMobil in 2009 and 2012.

The following is a list of urban areas by the number of companies on the 2014 Fortune 1000 list that are located there.

See also
 Fortune Global 500
 List of largest companies by revenue

References

Fortune (magazine)
Lists of companies by revenue